The Islamic Human Rights Commission (IHRC) is a non-profit organisation based in London. Its stated mission is to "work with different organisations from Muslim and non-Muslim backgrounds, to campaign for justice for all peoples regardless of their racial, confessional or political background." The group is based in London and was established in 1997. The organisation, since 2007, has consultative status with the United Nations Department of Economic and Social Affairs.

Philosophy
The IHRC states its philosophy derives from:
Qur'anic injunctions that command believers to rise up in defence of the oppressed. "And what reason have you that you should not fight in the way of Allah and of the weak among the men and the women and the children, (of) those who say: Our Lord! cause us to go forth from this town, whose people are oppressors, and give us from Thee a guardian and give us from Thee a helper." Qur'an 4:75

Jytte Klausen of Brandeis University writes that the IHRC forms part of the organized Muslim community in Europe.

However, according to the now defunct Awaaz, the IHRC is "a radical Islamist organisation that uses the language of human rights to promote an extremist agenda including the adoption of shariah law". In a report entitled "The Islamist Right – key tendencies", Awaaz also states the IHRC is part of a corpus of right-wing Islamist and neo-Khomeiniist organisations, a charge the IHRC denies. Awaaz's claims were echoed by journalist Melanie Phillips, who stated in The Spectator that the IHRC was, "the most conspicuous promoter of Khomeini jihadism in the UK, ... [and] is said to be close to Iran."

However, public intellectual and journalist Stuart Weir argues that IHRC are amongst the representative voices of Muslims in the UK stating:

...the staff and voluntary workers of the Islamic Human Rights Commission – ... put the lie to the common idea that Islam and human rights are irreconcilable.

Activities
The organisation states it is a campaign, research and advocacy organisation. It also engages in ad hoc and one-off projects.

Campaigns

The campaigns section features heavily on the organisation's website.

Its current campaigns focus on anti-terrorism laws in the UK. The organisation is calling of their repeal. Other main campaigns include one for political prisoners in Saudi Arabia. During the 2014 summer war on Gaza, IHRC held a high-profile campaign to get people to show solidarity with Palestinians by flying a Palestinian flag.

Other campaigns include the Prisoners of Faith project, which has included campaigns to release various religious figures from imprisonment for their religious beliefs. Among these are Mu'allim Ibrahim Zakzaky released 1998, Gul Aslan released 1999, Nureddin Sirin, released 2004. The organisation also states the following have been released as a result of their campaigning: Mallam Turi, Zeenah Ibrahim from Nigeria; Sheikh Al-Jamri, Bahrain; Huda Kaya, Bekir Yildiz, Recep Tayyep Erdogan, Nurilhak Saatcioglu, Nurcihan Saatioglu, Turkey; Sheikh Ahmed Yassine, Abdul Aziz Rantissi, Rabbi Biton, Sheikh Abdulkareem Obeid, Mustafa Dirani from Israeli detention; Mohammed Mahdi Akef, Egypt; Dr. Muhammad Osman Elamin, Sudan; Cehl Meeah, Mauritius; Abbasi Madani and Ali Behadj, Algeria. Current campaigns for 'Prisoners of Faith' focus on US detainees and include Sheikh Omar Abdul Rahman, his attorney Lynne Stewart (released December 2013), Ghassen Elashi and former Black Panther Imam Jamil Al-Amin, as well as Egyptian detainees including Khairet El-Shater (released in 2010 and reincarcerated in 2013 after the coup).

Other campaigns work include thematic and country based campaigns e.g. for release of detainees in Bahrain, against brutalisation of immigrant women in France, and against niqāb bans in France, Bosnia, Belgium and Spain.

In 2000 the IHRC "protested against a government-backed European directive, which, according to them, would force Muslim charities and schools to employ non-believers and homosexuals".

IHRC has promoted various boycott, divestment and sanctions actions, including a boycott of Israeli dates in the UK. In May 2010, IHRC organised and led a delegation of European Muslim organisations to Turkey to lobby the Turkish government to veto Israel's accession to the Organisation for Economic Co-operation and Development.

Other notable campaigns saw the campaign to have Mat Sah Satray and other ISA detainees in Malaysia released in 2009.

In 2006, IHRC began an emergency campaign against the imminent execution of British and Pakistani dual national Mirza Tahir Hussain. Other organisations, including Fair Trials Abroad and Amnesty International, joined the campaign.

After a BBC documentary broadcast on 15 July 2004 exposed very strong anti-Islamic opinions within the far-right British National Party, the IHRC has campaigned for the prohibition of that party.

Advocacy

The bulk of IHRC's advocacy work, it claims, is undertaken away from the public glare and involves helping individuals with discrimination cases involving Islamophobia and anti-Muslim racism. Some public testimonies and case reports exist highlighting this section of IHRCs work. In 2004 PhD student Yasir Abdelmouttalib was viciously assaulted in a race hate attack and left severely disabled. His mother states:
'Fortunately... I got support from... Islamic Human Rights
Commission (IHRC), the only community group in London with case workers to help Muslim victims of hate crimes like Yasir, and that helped us to pull through'.
On 3 August 2006, the IHRC asked for judicial review of its allegations that the British government assisted with military shipments to Israel, which was eventually denied.

In 2010, IHRC publicly advocated against the introduction of full body scanners at UK ports.

In 2013 it claimed victory in the case, after the British government made a U-turn on the introduction of the full naked body scanners, before the matter came to court. The case, which IHRC supported objected to the scanners on the grounds of:

the dissolution of civil liberties, health issues, the explicit nature of the body scanners and storage of images, as well as the fact that the scanners could not detect plastics and liquids which was given as a reason for their introduction.

In 2014, IHRC Legal, a new section of IHRC was launched, quickly claiming a victory in a discrimination case featuring university lecturer who claimed indirect racial discrimination against his employers. His case was settled out of court.

The advocacy section is also involved in trial monitoring, with observer trips to Turkey, Mauritius and Bahrain featuring in this field.

Research

Hate crimes and discrimination
The organisation produced several reports based on third party reporting of anti-Muslim hate crimes in the UK, including statistics the month after 9-11 and the year post-9-11.

Previously it had employed basic survey methods to generate statistics for 1999 and 2000.

In 2009–10 it launched a pilot project in the UK and France using a survey method, resulting in the publication of its findings in Getting the Message: The Recurrence of Hate Crimes in the UK (2011) and France and the Hated Society: Muslims Experiences (2012).

The project was refined and rerun in California, US and Canada resulting in the publication of Once Upon a Hatred: Anti-Muslim experiences in the USA (2013) and Only Canadian: The Experience of Hate Moderated Differential Citizenship for Muslims (2014).

In 2014, the organisation undertook data collection in the UK once more.

Its methodology involves surveying a sample of the Muslim population in each country and assessing the levels of negative experience encountered. It assesses levels of physical attack (hate crimes), verbal abuse, seeing negative depiction of Islam and Muslims in the media.

The statistics for physical assault in the various surveys showed that in the UK, nearly 14% had experienced a violent physical assault. In France, 11%, in the US (California) nearly 30% and in Canada, 11%. If the UK figures are extrapolated to the entire UK population of Muslims (nearly 3 million), it suggest that some 420,000 Muslims have experienced a physical hate attack.

Country reports
IHRC produces country reports on human rights abuses e.g. Nigeria. It also submits reports to the Universal Periodic Review (UPR) mechanism at the United Nations. The list of countries it has submitted reports on in the period 2007–2010 are: Iraq, China, Egypt, Saudi Arabia, France, Sri Lanka, The Philippines, Tunisia, Morocco, India, Bahrain, United Kingdom.

Thematic reports
It also produces thematic reports e.g. on hijab and freedom of religious expression, even submitting some of these to UN committees such as the Committee for the Elimination of Discrimination Against Women (CEDAW).

Anti-terrorism laws
It has also produced several critical works overviewing anti-terrorism laws, particularly in the UK. Its 2006 report 'Anti-terrorism: A Modern day Witch-hunt' by Fahad Ansari was praised by Tony Benn and Bruce Kent. According to Benn:

Scholarly work of this kind helps us by emphasising the importance of Civil Liberties to all communities.

Kent stated it was a:
... most interesting – and shocking – terrorism report... it will do much good.

Further reports, briefings and submissions to the government's consultations tackled various anti-terrorism laws and policies including the CONTEST and PREVENT strategies, moves to remove citizenship from terror suspects, stops and searches, and stops at ports and airports. They have also expressed the importance for 'reform' of Schedule 7 on the basis that it was 'discriminatory' towards Muslims.

In 2014 it produced a response to the UK government's Tackling Extremism in the UK report.

The organisation started 2015 by stating that it was pulling out of the consultative process on the anti-terror laws with the government, claiming that participation only legitimated the raft of unjust laws. It announced this move in conjunction with the launch of its briefing Proposed Counter Terrorism and Security Bill an Orwellian Possibility

Citizenship
In 2004, IHRC launched the British Muslims' Expectations of the Government (BMEG) research project. It culminated in six reports on citizenship, discrimination, education, hijab, law and media and representation. The focus on theoretical aspects of citizenship in this project has become a key theme in IHRC research work. According to Professor D. Ray Heisey, the project:

... examined 1125 responses to a questionnaire and the responses from 52 personal interviews of Muslims living in various cities within the UK. They included a range of respondents in age, education, gender, and economic class...

The strength of these studies is in the intercultural approach taken and the comprehensive nature of the investigation in looking at the topics as seen in the literature as well as the results of their extensive array of questions on numerous topics related to their perceptions of the consequences of living in a majority culture. Each volume ends with the views of leading citizens on the given topic and a list of recommendations for the British government to consider at the policy level as a result of the findings.

In addition to the BMEG project, IHRC's research section has used the idea of citizenship as a critical lens through which to discuss social issue. It looks both at the technical specificity of citizenship and its denial (in a crossover of concern with the advocacy and campaigns departments) e.g. on issues of citizenship stripping in countries as diverse as the UK, Bahrain, UAE and Kuwait. It also looks at the sociological implications and discriminatory aspects of citizenship tests as they have developed e.g. in the UK and Germany.

Human rights theory
Other theoretical work includes papers on human rights discourse, as well as Islam and human rights represented in reports, papers presented at seminars, participation in wider research projects e.g. Trust Building in Conflict Transformation with the Centre for the Study of Radicalisation and Contemporary Political Violence.

Collaborative work

In 2006, IHRC issued a joint statement signed by various public figures calling for an immediate ceasefire in the Israel-Lebanon war, and calling on the British government to be evenhanded. Signatories included Vanessa Redgrave, various other MPs including David Gottlieb, Ann Cryer, Clare Short, Frank Dobson, Ian Gibson, John Austin and Jeremy Corbyn, as well as various Islamic, Christian and Jewish groups and individuals including Muslim Council of Britain, Jews Against Zionism, Rev Fr. Frank Gelli, Rev Steven Sizer, Roland Rance, and Lord Nazir Ahmed. This statement and IHRC's research work and participation in protest events during the war attracted controversy in the right-wing press (see Controversy and Criticism below).

The IHRC has on a number of occasions organised joint statements with various Islamic groups about British terror legislation, and has collaborated with prominent civil liberties lawyers Gareth Peirce and Louise Christian.

Other projects

Institutional Islamophobia Conference

In December 2014, the organisation is organised the conference Institutional Islamophobia, subtitling it 'A conference to examine state racism and social engineering of the Muslim community'. Speakers slated to talk on the day were Hatem Bazian (co-founder of Zaytuna College, and Professor at UC Berkeley), Malia Bouattia – Black Students' Officer at the National Union of Students, author and academic Marie Breen Smyth from the University of Surrey, Ramon Grosfoguel a professor from UC Berkeley, Les Levidow from the Campaign Against Criminalising Communities and Jews for Boycotting Israeli Goods, Richard Haley, the Chair of Scotland Against Criminalising Communities, Peter Oborne, the Chief political commentator of the Daily Telegraph and associate editor of The Spectator, Salman Sayyid the author and academic bases at the University of Leeds, AbdoolKarim Vakil who is Chair of the Research and Documentation Committee of the Muslim Council of Britain, and an academic at King's College London, Lee Jasper, former adviser to the London Mayor, and co-chair of Black Activists Rising Against Cuts & National Black Members Officer for the Respect Party, and the organisation's Head of research Arzu Merali.

The conference was part of an initiative by Decoloniality Europe where several organised across Europe as part of the International Day Against Islamophobia Initiative, launched on 9 December in Brussels, Belgium.

Other conferences took place in Paris, Amsterdam and Brussels.

Two days before the conference was scheduled to take place, Birkbeck, University of London, cancelled the organisation's booking for the conference (see Controversies below), forcing the event to be relocated to the P21 Gallery. Birkbeck were roundly criticised for the cancellation with academics and teaching unions protesting the move, claiming that the cancellation was itself evidence of Islamophobia and racism.

Annual Islamophobia Awards

The Annual Islamophobia Awards is the name of a spoof awards ceremony held by the organisation in 2003–2006 and again from 2014 onwards. The organisation seek nominations from the public and open a public voting system to find the 'Islamophobes' of the year from any sector of public life.

List of 'Negative' Winners of the Islamophobia Awards
In the Islamophobia Awards there are two divisions of awards given, one division is the spoof division given to the public vote for Islamophobes for being 'Islamophobic', the other is given to people who have dedicated their work to tackling Islamophobia and to recognize them.

2003
The First Annual Islamophobia Awards were hosted on 31 May 2003

Islamophobe of the Year – George Bush JR, President of the United States of America

2004
The second annual Islamophobia Awards took place on 26 June 2004

Islamophobe of the Year – George Bush JR, President of the United States of America

2005

2006

Al-Quds Day, UK

The commission is one of the organisers of the annual Al-Quds Day demonstration in London, initiated by Ayatollah Khomeini.

Against Zionism: Jewish Perspectives

In 2006, the organisation brought together leading Jewish activists in London, for an international conference. The papers from the conference were published in English and Turkish. Speakers at the conference included Michel Warschawski, Uri Davis, Rabbi Yisroel Weiss, Rabbi Ahron Cohen, Roland Rance, Les Levidow, Jeffrey Blankfort, Professor Yakov Rabkin, and John Rose.

Towards a New Liberation Theology: Reflections on Palestine

In 2005, the IHRC brought Christian, Muslim and Jewish scholars, clerics and activists together for an international conference discussing Liberation Theology in the context of Palestine. The papers were published as a book of the same name in 2009.

Genocide Memorial Day

In 2010, IHRC inaugurated an annual event commemorating genocides from modern history. The event, held in London in January included a Holocaust survivor speaking about his experiences during the period and his support for the Palestinian struggle. Speakers at the event included Imam Achmad Cassiem, Lee Jasper, Randeep Ramesh, Rabbi Beck, Rabbi Ahron Cohen, Sameh Habeeb. Messages were also sent from Ward Churchill and Hasan Nuhanovic.

The event has been held every year since then on the third Sunday of January, a date associated with the cessation of the Israeli war against Gaza in 2009, known as Operation Cast Lead.

Human Rights and Israel at 60

In 2008, IHRC organised the international conference 'Human Rights and Israel at 60'. Speakers included: Michael Warschawski (Alternative Information Center); Yehudit Keshet (Checkpoint Watch); Daud Abdullah (Palestinian Return Centre); Jennifer Loewenstein (University of Wisconsin); Michael Bailey (Oxfam); Meir Margalit (Israeli Committee against House Demolitions).

Controversies

2006 Lebanon War

During the 2006 Lebanon War, IHRC undertook various actions in opposition to the war and called on the British government to be evenhanded in its treatment of the parties. It issued a briefing entitled The Blame Game: International Law and the Current Crisis in the Middle East.

Melanie Phillips wrote of the briefing in The Spectator that IHRC Chair Massoud Shadjareh asked "his followers" and "British Muslims" to provide financial assistance to Hezbollah, and called for the occupation of Israel and "regime change" by Hezbollah on self-defence grounds. She also highlighted that banners were seen at IHRC demonstrations saying "We are all Hezbollah now". Ilan Pappe supported the IHRC and its briefing in a letter to The Editor of The Spectator, asserting that it was accurate and similar to those "one can find in the annual reports of Amnesty international and the Israeli human rights societies reports", describing Philips' accusations as "vicious and unfounded".

In a 2008 essay, "Brixton, Berkley and Other Roads to Radicalisation", Shadjareh states:
The primary slaughter was of a people of another nation, and for that reason, back in '68, "We were all Ho Chi Minh", and for the same reason in 2006, aside from any other affiliations the authors may have, we authorised IHRC to add its name to the posters of dead and injured Lebanese children during the 33-day war, because then and now, "We are All Hizbullah." The Spectator and various parts of the right wing press declared that this was a sign that an Iranian backed spate of terror attacks on the UK were imminent, citing in particular the posters and IHRC. They failed to note that Hizbullah flags at said demonstrations were sported by many including orthodox Rabbis, and the now infamous banners held by amongst others middle class English women appalled at the slaughter.

Threats from far-right groups

Far-right groups threatened to demonstrate against the Institutional Islamophobia Conference in December 2014, and SOAS Anarchist Society stated they would hold a counter-demonstration. Birkbeck University of London, where the conference was scheduled to be held cancelled the booking, reportedly citing concerns about the presence of the SOAS Anarchist Society. The move by Birkbeck was heavily criticised.

Apology from The Sunday Times

On 2 December 2007, in The Sunday Times, Shiraz Maher wrote an article entitled "A failure to confront radical Islam". The article claimed that IHRC Chair Massoud Shadjareh, whilst appearing on the Today programme, made moral equivalents between Muslims in Guantanamo Bay and the fate of Gillian Gibbons in Sudan. The Sunday Times subsequently issued a correction, which held that this and other suggestions that Shadjareh had condoned the Sudanese government's actions were "totally untrue", and that he had in fact "condemned outright" Gibbons' treatment by the Sudanese government. Shadjareh brought a libel complaint against the newspaper which he won. The newspaper published an apology and agreed to pay Shadjareh "substantial damages".

2015 Charlie Hebdo award
In March 2015, IHRC gave the French satirical magazine Charlie Hebdo their "International Islamophobe of the Year" award, less than two months after 12 members of staff at the magazine had been killed by Islamist extremists. The group was also criticised for giving counter extremism campaigner and Muslim Maajid Nawaz its "UK Islamophobe of the Year" award.

Nazim Ali

In June 2017 after the Grenfell Tower fire, Nazim Ali, a director of the IHRC, was videotaped telling a group of protestors that "It is the Zionists who give money to the Tory party, to kill people in high rise blocks" and "Careful, careful, careful of those rabbis who belong to the Board of Deputies, who have got blood on their hands." Ali later said that The Sunday Telegraph had "not presented what I said accurately in the wider context of what was said in the prelude to the minute's silence for Grenfell. As presented it sounds somewhat inelegant... To say that some of Theresa May or the Tory party's supporters are Zionists is hardly controversial." An attempt by the Campaign Against Antisemitism to bring a private prosecution for inciting racial or religious hatred, was blocked by the Crown Prosecution Service as they determined there was no "realistic prospect of conviction".

Criticisms

Hezbollah support

According to Melanie Phillips, the organisation supports Hezbollah. Phillips made her claim in reference to the court case brought by the organisation against arms flights to Israel during the 2006 war, when IHRC, according to the BBC News website, sought:

permission to bring proceedings against the Civil Aviation Authority, the Foreign and Commonwealth Office and Defence Secretary Des Brown, to stop "grave and serious violations" of international humanitarian law and "crimes" against the Geneva Convention.

In response to Phillips' article, Ilan Pappé wrote to The Spectator wherein the claims were made stating:

I read with great bewilderment and astonishment the accusations made by Melanie Philips against the IHRC (The Spectator, 3 August 2006). I have been a severe critique of Israel and Zionism for many years. As a Jew born in Israel my point of departure was both universal and Jewish. I felt, as I still do today, that Israel and present Zionism abuse and distort the basic humanist and universal values Judaism has given the world. This cultural legacy that has placed Jews at the forefront in the struggle for civil rights in the USA and against the Apartheid regime in South Africa.

The same legacy and concern has led Jews like myself around the world to stand alongside Muslim victims wherever they were, even when the victimizers were Jews and Israelis. This is how I came to know the IHRC. I read the same documents Philips mentions before I decided to be part of the campaign in Britain for human rights for everyone regardless of their race, religion or nationality.

As this is a letter and not an article I do have the space to refute all the vicious and unfounded accusations made by Philips. Let me refer only to the direct reference in the article to the IHRC's legal briefing. This briefing is a succinct and accurate description of the war crimes Israel commits in the occupied territories. Similar descriptions and analysis one can find in the annual reports of Amnesty international and the Israeli human rights societies reports.

Abu Hamza

IHRC's chairman, Massoud Shadjareh criticised the prosecution of Abu Hamza in 2006, his extradition in 2012 to the US, and his conviction in 2014 in the US.

IHRC has been deeply critical of the treatment of Abu Hamza al-Masri on various counts. It has highlighted what it calls "double standards" in his treatment by the press, politicians and the legal system, arguing that the case of al-Masri highlighted societal and judicial double standards averring to the failure to convict British National Party leader Nick Griffin and his colleague in the same week as convicting al-Masri of similar crimes. IHRC's chair, Massoud Shadjareh stated:

Notwithstanding Abu Hamza's controversial character and views, it seems astounding that this week Nick Griffin and his co-defendant from the BNP walked free from court and Abu Hamza has been convicted. 

At a time when we are witnessing free speech mania directed at Muslims who have been told to put up with any insult, offence and abuse in the name of free speech, this verdict sends yet another signal that Muslims are not equal in the eyes of the law of this country.

Al-Masri's extradition, along with four other men on unrelated cases, to the US in 2012 was described by IHRC as evidence of 'justice shopping' by the UK government:

in which officials seek out countries where lower evidence thresholds apply or where defendant's rights are not as robust. Today's remarks by the PM David Cameron appearing to criticise our commitment to the European Convention on Human Rights for making deportations difficult confirms this belief.

Omar Abdel-Rahman

The group has campaigned for the release of Omar Abdel-Rahman, who was convicted for the 1993 World Trade Center bombing, citing criticisms of the judgment including the use of laws not used since the American Civil War to convict Abdel-Rahman. The organisation also campaigned for the release of Abdel-Rahman's lawyer Lynne Stewart, who was convicted of supporting terrorists. Stewart was released on 31 December 2013. IHRC presented her with an awards for her fight against Islamophobia in February 2014.

Selectivity 
There is disagreement over the organisation's stance on Muslim countries. Its supporters, including British MPs, US academics and others claim it to be a source of good and reliable information for abuses in Bahrain, Saudi Arabia, Sudan, Turkey, Indonesia, Pakistan, Bangladesh and Malaysia. Anthony McRoy, in his 2006 book From Rushdie to 7/7: The Radicalisation of Islam in Britain writes that 
.. an interesting aspect of IHRC radicalism is that the group does not restrict criticism of human rights abuses to Western governments... it also condemns 'militant' Islamic regimes, such as Sudan for human rights abuses in Darfur...

However, in a 2008 article published in the Harvard Human Rights Journal, Eric Heinze claims that:
On the whole, the more oppressive an Islamic state is, and the more it officially propagates pro-Islamic doctrines or institutions, the less likely the Islamic Human Rights Commission has been to criticize it. That approach offends any concept of fairness in the application of human rights.

Another contradictory critique comes from pro-Israel groups like the Stephen Roth Institute, who critique IHRC's opposition to the Saudi Arabian regime, including links it claims the organisation has with UK based Saudi dissident Muhammad al-Mas'ari. The institute also criticises IHRC for working with Imam Muhammad al-'Asi (whom they incorrectly refer to as an American convert), who was the elected Imam of the Washington D.C. Mosque but who was locked out of the premises and banned by the Saudi Embassy.

Additionally the Institute accuses IHRC of anti-Semitism and conspiricsim in the manner of its pro-Palestine stance.

2003 Award to Ariel Sharon for Islamophobia

During the 2003 Annual Islamophobia Awards, Ariel Sharon was announced as the "winner" of the "Most Islamophobic International Politician of the Year'", for an interview allegedly given in 1956. The interview's authenticity has never been verified and it is believed by many to be a hoax.

Alcohol investment
On 23 August 2013, an article in The Independent reported that the IHRC held shares in the Baa Bar Group, a Liverpool-based bar chain that sells alcoholic beverages. The article contrasted this with the IHRC's own publication that warned against the use of alcohol, considering that "the greatest underminer and saboteur of discipline and confidence is alcohol and so-called social drinking", and that "alcohol is the curse of the oppressed people and a boon for the oppressors. Not only is the oppressor making enormous profits from liquor but it also totally immobilizes and paralyses the critical faculties of the oppressed". The IHRC responded to the article four days later, explaining that the shares were a gift from a supporter, who told the Commission that they were shares in property. It pointed out that "some considerable time later, we came to know that the company was related to a company that dealt in alcohol, by which time the company had been delisted from the stock exchange, and the shares were deemed almost worthless". It stated that the commission has "sought advice as to how best to dispose of these shares without financially benefiting from this trade".

See also
 Cairo Declaration on Human Rights in Islam

External links
 Official website

Notes

Human rights organisations based in the United Kingdom
Islamic organisations based in the United Kingdom
Non-profit organisations based in London
Human rights in Islam
Hezbollah